Pyrus elaeagrifolia, the oleaster-leafed pear, is a species of wild pear plant in the genus Pyrus (Rosaceae), the specific name referring to the similarity of its foliage to that of Elaeagnus angustifolia - the so-called 'wild olive' or oleaster.

It is native to Albania, Bulgaria, Greece, Romania, Turkey, and Ukraine's Crimea. The flowers are hermaphrodite. The species is highly resistant to drought and frost. It is sympatric with Pyrus pyraster. The species was first described by Peter Simon Pallas in 1793.

Varieties 
Known subspecies are: Pyrus elaeagrifolia subsp. elaeagrifolia (no accessions), Pyrus elaeagrifolia subsp. kotschyana, Pyrus elaeagrifolia subsp. bulgarica, and Pyrus elaeagrifolia subsp. yaltirikii.

References

External links 

elaeagrifolia
Flora of Bulgaria